John Henry Russell (February 24, 1898 – December 4, 1972), nicknamed "Pistol", was an American Negro league second baseman in the 1920s and 1930s.

A native of Dolcito, Alabama, Russell made his Negro leagues debut in 1923 with the Memphis Red Sox. After three years with Memphis, he spent the following five seasons with the St. Louis Stars, and contributed six hits and two RBIs in the Stars' 1928 Negro National League championship series victory over the Chicago American Giants. While representing the Pittsburgh Crawfords, Russell laid down a successful suicide squeeze bunt in the 1933 East–West All-Star Game. He died in Cleveland, Ohio in 1972 at age 74.

References

External links
 and Baseball-Reference Black Baseball stats and Seamheads

1898 births
1972 deaths
Cleveland Red Sox players
Homestead Grays players
Indianapolis ABCs (1931–1933) players
Memphis Red Sox players
Pittsburgh Crawfords players
St. Louis Stars (baseball) players
20th-century African-American sportspeople
Baseball outfielders